Frances Fitzgerald Elmes (23 April 1867 – 1919) was a British-Australian feminist writer and columnist based in Melbourne and London.

Biography
Frances Fitzgerald Elmes was born in Somerset, England, 23 April 1867. She emigrated to Australia with her family and was raised in Berwick, Victoria, where her father was a medical practitioner. She became a journalist and wrote for The Australasian, The Argus and, after returning to England in 1905, the British Australasian. Her columns, short stories, two books and a play appeared under a variety of pen names, including F. F. Elmes, Frances Fitzgerald, F. F., and Frances Fitzgerald Fawkner.

In London, Elmes established a relationship with the British Australasians editor, Charles Henry Chomley (who was married to her close friend Ethel Chomley), during which she is reported to have had two children, a son in 1906 and a daughter in 1908. The relationship was apparently accepted by Chomley's wife and mother.

Elmes died in London in 1919 during the Spanish flu epidemic. After her death, her children were brought up by their father and his wife.

Selected works
Fitzgerald, Frances. The New Woman, a play, performed but not published, 1895.
Elmes, F. F. The Melbourne Cookery Book: compiled especially with the view of assisting the housewife in the cottage and villa home who must carefully study ways and means. Melbourne: Fraser and Jenkinson, 1906. 
Elmes, F. F. "Fashions in Whims: A London Sketch", The Argus, 29 February 1908, 6.
F. F. "The 'Tail' of a Fish", The Age, 24 April 1915, 18.
Fitzgerald, Frances. The Children at Kangaroo Creek, London: British Australasian, 1916. 
Fitzgerald, Frances. "The Woman Pays", British Australasian, 16 August 1917, 31.

References

Further reading
"List: Frances Fitzgerald Elmes". Trove. National Library of Australia.
Maria De Jong; Rosalind David, Two Remarkable Women: Frances Fitzgerald Fawkner and Sara 'Sally' Rainforth, Auckland, New Zealand: Remember the Days, 2013.  

1867 births
1919 deaths
19th-century Australian journalists
20th-century Australian journalists
19th-century Australian women writers
20th-century Australian women writers
Deaths from the Spanish flu pandemic in England
People from Berwick, Victoria
Journalists from Melbourne
People from Somerset
English emigrants to colonial Australia